City Hospital is a health facility on Urquhart Road in Aberdeen, Scotland. It is managed by NHS Grampian.

History
The facility, which was designed by William Smith, was established as an infectious diseases hospital in 1874. It was significantly expanded in 1895 and a new nurses' home was completed in 1931. The hospital joined the National Health Service in 1948. During the 1964 Aberdeen typhoid outbreak, over 400 cases were diagnosed and the patients were quarantined at the City Hospital and Woodend Hospital, although no fatalities resulted.

References

Hospitals in Aberdeen
1874 establishments in Scotland
Hospitals established in 1874
Hospital buildings completed in 1874
NHS Scotland hospitals